Richard Simon Darbyshire (born 8 March 1960) is an English singer, songwriter, producer, and songwriting coach. Richard Darbyshire is best known as the frontman for the 1980s synthpop group Living in a Box.

Biography

Early years
Richard Darbyshire was born in Stockport, Cheshire, in England. He went to school in Manchester, where he briefly attended Manchester Grammar School. At the age of 13, he followed his parents to Japan, where he attended an American boarding school.

Bathing in the sound of The Beatles, Darbyshire's interest in a musical career began early; he first took up the clarinet but then switched to guitar. While in Japan, Darbyshire was introduced to the soul music of Marvin Gaye, Al Green, and Curtis Mayfield via the US military station. He joined a band with a group of Americans playing Allman Brothers type of material. Although a major influence of the young Darbyshire was Bread, he took his music in a more soul- and R&B-oriented direction.

Back in England, Darbyshire sat his exams at the Manchester Grammar School and played with various bands of the Northern Music scene, such as Gammer and his Familiars. He also went to Oxford University, where he studied English literature.

Career
After university, Darbyshire briefly joined a Manchester band called Zu Zu Sharks, composed of Adam and the Ants bassist Gary Tibbs and Alistair Gordon on keyboards. Their single "Love Tumbles Down" was a number one hit in Spain, but Darbyshire left the band in 1983, unhappy with their pop sound.

Darbyshire continued writing songs. One of them, "Put Your Foot Down" was recorded by the Temptations for their album Together Again, released in 1987. He also co-wrote songs with singer Tessa Niles in 1985 for her upcoming album (which ultimately went unreleased). He also performed session work for Universal Music Group (UMG).

In 1985, Virgin Records, now part of Capitol Music Group,  wanted to sign Darbyshire to a contract, while Chrysalis Records asked him to be the vocalist/guitarist for a fledgling band consisting of drummer Anthony 'Tich' Critchlow and keyboardist Marcus Vere. After he sang the vocal on a track the band was working on called "Living in a Box", he chose to sign a five-year contract with the band, who ultimately named themselves after the song, Living in a Box.  The band released two albums: Living in a Box (1987) and Gatecrashing (1989).  Their eponymous single was a smash hit, cracking the top 20 in the US.

In 1990, while the band was recording their third full-length album, artistic differences between EMI (who had bought Chrysalis Records) and Darbyshire resulted in the split of the band before the album was completed.

In 1991, he sang "I Love a Lady" with Bandzilla, a big band created and led by composer-arranger Richard Niles (then-husband of Tessa Niles, with whom Darbyshire had previously worked). His performance can be heard on Richard Niles' website.

His debut solo effort, How Many Angels was released in 1994.  Singer Lisa Stansfield co-wrote two of the songs, "This I Swear" and "Tell Him No", and sang backing vocals on the album. How Many Angels also featured songs originally written for Living in a Box's third album, and new songs written by Darbyshire and Frank Musker. The album would be re-released in two different forms: Love Will Provide (1999) and This I Swear (20 tracks special edition) (2009), each including B-sides and new tracks.

Darbyshire then continued to write and produce songs with and for other artists, particularly Lisa Stansfield, but also Mike Francis, Frank Musker, Richard Niles, James Last, Monica Naranjo, Level 42 and Jennifer Rush, amongst others.

In 2004, Darbyshire won first prize at the USA Songwriting Competition in the R&B category.

More recently, he opened several songwriting workshops in London, to give writing lessons to young artists, such as Max Tuohy. He works closely with vocalist, wife and vocal coach Sonia Jones.

Discography

Living in a Box albums
1987: Living in a Box
1989: Gatecrashing

Solo albums
1994: How Many Angels
1999: Love Will Provide
2009: This I Swear (20 tracks special edition)

As musician/songwriter for other artists

References

External links
Richard Darbyshire's official website
Darbyshire on Discogs
 Darbyshire on AllMusic
Darbyshire on 45cat
Richard Darbyshire's "Love Will Provide" CD booklet
Darbyshire @Artist direct
Dr Richard Nile's official website
Sonia Jones's official website

1960 births
Living people
British vocal coaches
English bandleaders
English pop guitarists
English male guitarists
English male singer-songwriters
English male singers
English record producers
Musicians from Manchester
People from Stockport
Sophisti-pop musicians